Guglielmo Navorelli (Naples, 1865–1916) was an Italian painter. He painted mainly historical subjects and landscapes.

Biography
Navorelli first studied at the Naples Academy of Fine Arts, and then continued his education in Rome with private tutors. After he finished school, he became professor of design at a scuola serale in Naples.

Career
At the Naples Promotrice he exhibited a large canvas entitled Filippo Strozzi Commits Suicide in Prison. At the next Promotrice, he displayed Margherita Pusterla, L' avvelenamento di Don Giovanni, and some landscapes. Other works of Navorellis include Filippo Strozzi Writes the Verses of Virgil (1885),Tramonto (1888), In Un Cortile (1890), and Sopra San Rocco (1891).

References

1865 births
1916 deaths
19th-century Italian painters
20th-century Italian painters
Italian genre painters
Italian male painters
Painters from Naples
19th-century Italian male artists
20th-century Italian male artists